Phrynopus tautzorum is a species of frog in the family Strabomantidae. It is endemic to Peru and only known from its type locality near Maraypata, in the Ambo Province, Huánuco Region, at  asl. It lives in the puna grassland ecoregion. Individuals have found under stones on moist underground. Livestock farming occurred at the type locality, but its impact on this species is unknown.

References

tautzorum
Amphibians of the Andes
Amphibians of Peru
Endemic fauna of Peru
Amphibians described in 2003